"Hear My Prayer" is an anthem for soprano solo, chorus (SATB) and organ or orchestra composed by Felix Mendelssohn in Germany in 1844. The first performance took place in Crosby Hall, London, on 8 January 1845. The accompanist on that occasion was organist, composer and teacher Ann Mounsey (1811–1891). She later married the librettist of the work, William Bartholomew (1793–1867), who also collaborated with Mendelssohn on his oratorio Elijah (German: Elias). The anthem is particularly well known through the recording made in 1927 by treble Ernest Lough.

The text (derived from Psalm 55):

References

External links

Psalm settings
Compositions by Felix Mendelssohn
1844 compositions
Motets
Compositions in G major